Aki Kangasmäki (born May 24, 1989) is a Finnish ice hockey player who currently plays professionally in Finland for Lukko of the SM-liiga.

References

External links
 

Living people
Lukko players
1989 births
Chilliwack Bruins players
Finnish ice hockey forwards